Terrell Starr (June 5, 1925 – April 19, 2009) was a Democratic member of the Georgia State Senate from 1968 to 2007.

Born in Clayton County, Georgia, Starr was elected to the Georgia State Senate in 1968. He lived in Jonesboro, Georgia. Interstate 675 is named Terrell Starr Parkway in his honor.

Notes

External links
An archival video of Terrell Starr discussing tax policy in Georgia
Obituary in the Henry Herald

1925 births
2009 deaths
Democratic Party Georgia (U.S. state) state senators
People from Jonesboro, Georgia
20th-century American politicians
21st-century American politicians